The March 703 was a Formula 3 racing car built by March Engineering in 1970.

Design and development

The Mach 703 was the March 702's sister vehicle. Like the 702 built for Formula 2, the 703 was based on the 1969 693. The car unfortunately was far too heavy for a Formula 3 car and sold poorly.

Racing history
The 703s were used in the British Formula 3 Championship and neither driver was able to achieve a win with them. Only Dave Morgan managed a few podiums with his 703.

References

Formula Three cars
1970s cars